Milz  is a river of Bavaria and of Thuringia, Germany. It flows into the Franconian Saale in Saal an der Saale.

See also
List of rivers of Bavaria
List of rivers of Thuringia

References

Rivers of Bavaria
Rivers of Thuringia
Rivers of Germany